Gyrodon ripicola is a bolete fungus in the family Paxillaceae. Found in Singapore, the species was first described in 1971 by E.J.H. Corner as a species of Paxillus. Pegler and Young transferred it to the genus Gyrodon in 1981.

References

External links

Fungi described in 1971
Paxillaceae
Fungi of Asia